Gamache is a surname. Notable people with the surname include:

Joey Gamache (born 1966), American boxer
Justinne Gamache, American singer
Simon Gamache (born 1981), Canadian ice hockey player

Fictional characters
Henri Gamache, pseudonym of an otherwise unknown folk magic author of the 1940s
Chief Inspector Armand Gamache, the main character in a series of mystery novels written by Canadian author Louise Penny

See also
 Gamache River (disambiguation)